National Highway 925A, commonly referred to as NH 925A is a national highway in India. It is a spur road of National Highway 25.  NH-925A runs in the state of Rajasthan in India.

Route 
NH925A connects Satta and Gandhav in the state of Rajasthan.

Junctions  
 
  Terminal near Satta.
  Terminal near Ghandav.

See also 
 List of National Highways in India
 List of National Highways in India by state

References

External links 

 NH 925A on OpenStreetMap

National highways in India
National Highways in Rajasthan